Roberts family may refer to:

 List of people with surname Roberts
 Roberts (surname)
Roberts family (Liberia)
Earl Roberts, a title in the Peerage of the United Kingdom
Baron Clwyd, a title in the Peerage of the United Kingdom created for John Roberts